is a passenger railway station in the city of Tateyama, Chiba Prefecture, Japan, operated by the East Japan Railway Company (JR East).

Lines
Kokonoe Station is served by the Uchibo Line, and is located 91.7 km from the starting point of the line at Soga Station.

Station layout
The station consists of two opposed side platforms serving two tracks. The station is currently unattended.

Platforms

History
Kokonoe Station was opened on June 1, 1921. The station was absorbed into the JR East network upon the privatization of the Japan National Railways (JNR) on April 1, 1987. A new station building was completed in February 2007.

Passenger statistics
In fiscal 2006, the station was used by an average of 103 passengers daily.

Surrounding area
 Awa Regional Medical Center

See also
 List of railway stations in Japan

References

External links

  JR East Station information 

Railway stations in Chiba Prefecture
Railway stations in Japan opened in 1921
Uchibō Line
Tateyama, Chiba